Sillence is a surname. Notable people with the surname include:

David Sillence (born 1944), Australian geneticist
Roger Sillence (born 1977), English cricketer